Hans Gunnar Fredin (born 16 March 1966 in Söderhamn, Gävleborg) is a former Swedish Olympic swimmer. He competed at the 1984 Summer Olympics, where he swum the 100 m backstroke and the 200 m backstroke.

Clubs
Södertörns SS

References

1966 births
Swedish male backstroke swimmers
Living people
Swimmers at the 1984 Summer Olympics
Olympic swimmers of Sweden